Kim So-jin (born 1979) is a South Korean actress. She is known for playing a prosecutor in crime drama The King (2017), for which she received critical acclaim and won several  awards, including the Blue Dragon Film Award, Grand Bell Award and Baeksang Arts Award for Best Supporting Actress.

Filmography

Film

Television series

Web series

Television shows

Theater

Awards and nominations

Notes

References

External links
 
 
 
 Kim So-jin at PlayDB

1979 births
Living people
Chung-Ang University alumni
South Korean television actresses
South Korean film actresses
South Korean stage actresses
21st-century South Korean actresses
Korea National University of Arts alumni
Best Supporting Actress Asian Film Award winners
Best Supporting Actress Paeksang Arts Award (film) winners